International Rectifier was an American power management technology company manufacturing analog and mixed-signal ICs, advanced circuit devices, integrated power systems, and high-performance integrated components for computing. On 13 January 2015, the company became a part of Infineon Technologies.

IR's products, as a part of Infineon Technologies' overall semiconductor portfolio, continue to be used in many applications including lighting, automobile, satellite, aircraft, and defense systems; as well as key components in power supply systems in electronics-based products that include especially microcomputers, servers, networking and telecommunications equipment.

History
 1954: commercialization of germanium rectifiers
 1959: creation of the first silicon-based rectifier
 1974: first power and Darlington transistors which used glass passivation
 1979: first hexagonal power MOSFET
 1983: first intelligent power ICs
 1983: lost a patent infringement lawsuit over the rights to doxycycline to Pfizer, Inc., resulting in a judgment of $55 million to Pfizer.  To avoid bankruptcy, International Rectifier gave Pfizer its animal health and feed additive businesses.
 2000: developed FlipFET wafer packaging
 2002: developed DirectFET, a MOSFET packaging technology developed to address thermal limitations found in advanced computing, consumer and communications applications
 2003: developed iMOTION Integrated Design Platform for motor control applications
 2006: introduced SmartRectifier IC for AC/DC applications
 2007: launched SupIRBuck integrated voltage regulators
 2008: introduced revolutionary GaN-based power device platform
 2011: introduced PowIRstage devices and CHiL digital controllers
 2012: launched micro integrated power modules for motor control applications and COOLiRIGBTs for automotive.
 2014: bought by Infineon Technologies for $3 billion.
 2015: officially becomes a part of Infineon Technologies

Manufacturing
International Rectifier also had wafer fabrication and assembly facilities around the world. The locations include:

El Segundo, California
Temecula, California
Leominster, Massachusetts
Mesa, Arizona
San Jose, California
Newport, Wales
Tijuana, Mexico

References

External links

 
 International Rectifier Corporation History

Companies formerly listed on the New York Stock Exchange
Equipment semiconductor companies
Companies based in El Segundo, California
2014 mergers and acquisitions
Electronics companies established in 1947
Electronics companies disestablished in 2014
1947 establishments in California
2014 disestablishments in California
Defunct semiconductor companies of the United States
Defunct manufacturing companies based in Greater Los Angeles